Del rancho a la capital is a 1942 Mexican adventure comedy film directed by Raúl de Anda under his Producciones Raúl de Anda banner. It stars Domingo Soler, Susana Guízar, and Pedro Armendáriz.

References

External links
 

1942 films
Mexican black-and-white films
Mexican adventure comedy films
1940s adventure comedy films
1942 comedy films
1940s Mexican films